Ann Lauterbach (born 1942) is an American poet, essayist, art critic, and professor.

Selected bibliography
Full-length poetry collections
 Spell (Penguin Books, 2018)
 Under the Sign (Penguin Books, 2013)
 Or to Begin Again (Penguin Books, 2009)
 Hum (Penguin Books, 2005)
 If in Time: Selected Poems 1975-2000 (Penguin Books, 2001)
 On a Stair (Penguin Books, 1997)
 And for Example (Penguin Books, 1994)
 Clamor (Viking, 1991)
 Before Recollection (Princeton University Press, 1987)
 Many Times, but Then (University of Texas Press, 1979)

Essay collections
 The Night Sky: Writings on the Poetics of Experience (Viking, 2005)

Early life
Lauterbach was born and raised in New York City, and earned her B.A. from the University of Wisconsin. She lived in London for eight years, working in publishing and for art institutions, including London's Thames and Hudson art publishing house. On her return to the U.S., she worked in art galleries in New York before she began teaching.

Poetry
Her most recent poetry collection is Spell (Penguin Books, 2018). Her poems have been published in literary journals and magazines including Conjunctions, and in anthologies including American Hybrid: A Norton Anthology of New Poetry (W.W. Norton, 2009) and American Women Poets in the 21st Century: Where Lyric Meets Language (Wesleyan University Press, 2002).

Teaching
She has taught at Brooklyn College, Columbia University, the Iowa Writers Workshop, Princeton University, and at the City College of New York and Graduate Center of CUNY. Since 1991 she has taught at Bard College, and is currently a David and Ruth Schwab Professor of Languages and Literature there, where she teaches and co-directs the Writing Division of the M.F.A. program, and lives in Germantown, New York.  As an art critic, she has educated at the Yale School of Art, Yale University.

Honors
Her honors include fellowships from the Guggenheim Foundation, the Ingram Merrill Foundation, the John D. and Catherine T. MacArthur Foundation, and the New York State Foundation for the Arts.

References

External links
 
 Biography: The Poetry Foundation > Ann Lauterbach
 Poem: Conjunctions > 17, Fall 1991 > Tangled Reliquary by Ann Lauterbach
 Review: Rain Taxi > Winter 2009/2010 > A Review by Michael D. Snediker of Or to Begin Again by Ann Lauterbach
 Interview: Mappemunde > April 17, 2004 > An Interview with Ann Lauterbach by Tim Peterson
 Guide to the Ann Lauterbach Papers
 Ann Lauterbach Papers. Yale Collection of American Literature, Beinecke Rare Book and Manuscript Library.

1942 births
20th-century American poets
21st-century American poets
Bard College faculty
Columbia University faculty
Iowa Writers' Workshop faculty
Living people
MacArthur Fellows
University of Wisconsin–Madison alumni
Writers from New York (state)
American women poets
American women essayists
20th-century American women writers
21st-century American women writers
20th-century American essayists
21st-century American essayists
Brooklyn College alumni
American women academics